Haahr may refer to:

 Elijah Haahr (born 1982), American politician
 Merete Haahr (1924–2004), Danish chess master